Mnazi Moja (swahili for "one palm") is a settlement in Kenya's Coast Province.

References 

Populated places in Coast Province